Shannon O'Brien (born 5 October 2001) is an English professional football forward who plays for Leicester City of the FA WSL.

Club career

Born and raised in Coventry, O'Brien began her football career in the youth team of Aston Villa. She joined Coventry United in 2018 and made 11 league appearances, scoring four goals, as the team won the 2018–19 FA Women's National League Southern Division.

O'Brien continued to play with Coventry United in the FA Women's Championship, before transferring to Leicester City in January 2021. She contributed three goals in nine appearances in all competitions as Leicester secured promotion to the FA WSL.

International career

Despite her conspicuously Irish name, O'Brien is not eligible to play for the Republic of Ireland women's national football team and aspired to represent England at international level. In February 2022 she was called up by the England women's national under-23 football team.

References

External links

2001 births
Women's association football forwards
Women's Super League players
English women's footballers
Aston Villa W.F.C. players
Coventry United W.F.C. players
Footballers from Coventry
Living people
Leicester City W.F.C. players
Women's Championship (England) players
England women's under-23 international footballers